Wickham Bishops is a village and civil parish in the Maldon district of Essex, England. It is located around three miles north of the town of Maldon and around two miles south-east of Witham, in whose post town it lies.

The place name Wickham Bishops is first attested in the Domesday Book of 1086, where it appears as Wicham, meaning 'dwelling place with a (dairy) farm'. Bishops refers to the fact that the land belonged to the Bishop of London. Other references note the historic name of Wycham Episcopi.

Governance
Wickham Bishops is part of the electoral ward called Wickham Bishops and Woodham. The population of this ward at the 2011 census was 3,500.

Churches 
The Church of England parish church is St Bartholomew's. The church was built on the western side of the hill on which the village stands.  The clock on its steeple was converted to an electronic mechanism in June 2008 (previously being wound by hand). St Bartholomew's is a Victorian replacement for the medieval St Peter's Church, which stands alone in the fields to the west near the River Blackwater, and beyond the disused railway line to Maldon.

The redundant Church of St Peter was probably built as a private chapel for the bishops of London who then owned the village. Since 1975 it has belonged to the Friends of Friendless Churches.

Local amenities and organisations
Wickham Bishops has a village hall (reconstructed in 2005), playing fields, a library, tennis courts, a hairdresser, health food shop, estate agent, a One Stop local shop/off licence and two pubs: the Mitre and the Chequers.

There is a small library which is located in the old school building in School Road.

Wickham Bishops Drama Club 
The village's drama club, named 'Wickham Bishops Drama Club', first performed in 1928 with a production of HMS Pinafore. Since then, the club continues to perform various productions throughout the year featuring both their adult group and Junior Workshop. The club rehearses twice a week, Mondays and Thursdays 8–10 pm, all year round currently producing 4 shows a year: the pantomime, the summer production, a spring play and an entry for the Gimson One Act Play Festival.

Girlguiding in Wickham Bishops 
Witham South District of GirlGuiding UK covers the area of Wickham Bishops, Great Totham and the surrounding villages; it is made up of two Rainbow packs for girls aged 5–7 years old and a Brownie pack for girls aged 7–10.

Scouting in Wickham Bishops 
1st Beacon Hill is a part of Maldon and East Essex Scouts and is made up of Beaver, Cubs and Scout packs for boys and girls who live in Wickham Bishops, Great Totham and the surrounding villages.

Transport 
Wickham Bishops is located close to the A12 road.

The village once had a railway station of its own on the Witham–Maldon branch line, which opened in 1848 and closed in 1964. Nowadays, the nearest railway station is Witham on the Great Eastern Main Line.

The number 90 bus service runs between Maldon, Wickham Bishops and Witham generally every half an hour on weekdays.

Notable people 
England cricket captain Alastair Cook lived in Wickham Bishops as a boy.

Composer Nicola LeFanu was born in Wickham Bishops

References

External links

Wickham Bishops Parish Council website
St Bartholomews Church Website
Guardians of the Village Churches of St. Bartholomew's Wickham Bishops and St Nicholas' Little Braxted

Villages in Essex
Maldon District